DYNY-TV channel 42 is a UHF television station owned by Information Broadcast Unlimited (IBU) and operated by Breakthrough and Milestones Productions International (BMPI), the network's content provider and marketing arm and Christian religious organization Members Church of God International (MCGI). The station's transmitter is located in Jordan, Guimaras with the power of 5,000 watts.

Television stations in Iloilo City
Television channels and stations established in 2002
Members Church of God International
2002 establishments in the Philippines